Thank You Mr. D.J. is the third studio album by Yvonne Chaka Chaka, featuring the hit singles "Umqomboti" and  "Thank You Mr. DJ".

Track listing
Credits adapted from loot.

Credits

Co-producer – Herbert Xulu, Sello Twala
Engineer, co-producer – Richard Mitchell
Executive producer – Phil Hollis
Producer, arrangement – Attie Van Wyk

References

External links

Yvonne Chaka Chaka albums
1987 albums